Made in England is the fourth album by British rock band Atomic Rooster. Although previously known for generally having a progressive rock style, this album saw the band moving in more of a funk/soul direction, largely influenced by new singer Chris Farlowe. Apart from founder member Vincent Crane, the album was recorded by an entirely different lineup to that of the band's prior effort, In Hearing of Atomic Rooster. Previous members John Du Cann and Paul Hammond had departed in protest at Crane's intended new musical direction.

In the UK and Germany, original copies of the LP came wrapped in an actual denim sleeve. Later pressings came in a standard art sleeve. In the US, the record was issued on Elektra in the standard sleeve. It was further reissued in Germany in 1977, this time in yet another new sleeve and retitled This is Atomic Rooster.

The only UK single from Made in England was "Stand by Me".

The album reached #60 in Canada.

Track listing 
Side one
 "Time Take My Life" (Crane) 6:01
 "Stand by Me" (Crane) 3:47
 "Little Bit of Inner Air" (Parnell) 2:39
 "Don't Know What Went Wrong" (Crane) 4:00
 "Never to Lose" (Bolton) 3:17
Side two
 "Introduction" (Crane) 0:26 - indexed together with "Breathless" on all CDs
 "Breathless" (Crane) 4:51
 "Space Cowboy" (Bolton) 3:20
 "People You Can't Trust" (Crane) 3:53
 "All in Satan's Name" (Parnell) 4:44
 "Close Your Eyes" (Crane) 3:49

2004 Castle Music CD reissue bonus tracks

 "Stand by Me" (Crane) 3:24 - BBC Radio Session, 12 June 1972
 "Breakthrough" (Crane/Pat Darnell) 3:07 - BBC Radio Session, 12 June 1972
 "Save Me" aka "Friday the 13th" (Crane) 3:42 - BBC Radio Session, 7 December 1972
 "Close Your Eyes" (Crane) 2:41 - BBC Radio Session, 7 December 1972
 "Stand by Me" (Crane) 5:00 - BBC Radio 1 Live in Concert, 27 July 1972
 "People You Can't Trust" (Crane) 4:40 - BBC Radio 1 Live in Concert, 27 July 1972
 "All in Satan's Name" (Parnell) 4:01 - BBC Radio 1 Live in Concert, 27 July 1972
 "Devil's Answer" (Du Cann) 7:12 - BBC Radio 1 Live in Concert, 27 July 1972
 Tracks 15 to 18 were previously released on BBC Radio 1 Live in Concert

1991 (and 1995 remastered Digipack) Repertoire Records / 2003 Akarma Records unlicensed CD reissue bonus tracks

 "Goodbye Planet Earth" (Mandala) 4:09 - Nice 'n' Greasy album track
 "Satan's Wheel" (Crane) 6:40 - as above

Personnel 
Atomic Rooster
 Vincent Crane - Hammond organ, piano, ARP synthesizer, keyboard bass
 Chris Farlowe - vocals
 Steve Bolton - guitars
 Ric Parnell - drums, percussion, vocals on "Little Bit of Inner Air"

Additional personnel
 Bill Smith - bass guitar on "Stand by Me"
 Doris Troy and Liza Strike - backing vocals on "Stand by Me" and "People You Can't Trust"

References 

 The New Musical Express Book of Rock, 1975, Star Books, 

Atomic Rooster albums
1972 albums
Elektra Records albums
Dawn Records albums
Brain Records albums
Pye Records albums
Repertoire Records albums
Sequel Records albums
Castle Communications albums
Albums recorded at Trident Studios